Shenzhen Bay Sports Center (Simplified Chinese: 深圳湾体育中心), nicknamed Spring Cocoon for its shape, is a multiuse stadium in Shenzhen, China.  It is used mostly for table tennis, swimming and soccer competitions.  The stadium is known for hosting the annual RoboMaster Robotics Competition since 2015, as well as the opening ceremony and numerous competitions of the 2011 Summer Universiade.  The stadium has a capacity of 20,000 spectators and the Arena seats 13,000 more.  The Sports Center also hosts regular concerts and has been used as a military staging area.

Construction
An international design competition for the building was held in early 2008, and preparatory work began in November of the same year. Built on reclaimed land, the foundations were laid in February 2009, and the building was completed in mid-2011. The building consists of three arenas, a swimming pool, an indoor arena, and a multi-use stadium joined by a perforated external steel skin. Within the complex is 30-story office tower.

Transport
The stadium is within walking distance from Houhai station of Shenzhen metro and is at the proximity of the Nanshan Central business district development.

Hong Kong Protests
During the 2019–20 Hong Kong protests, satellite images showed the stadium being used to house more than 100 military APCs (armored personnel carriers) and trucks. Reporters from the Dutch news service Nederlandse Omroep Stichting later used an unmanned aerial vehicle to capture film footage the military performing anti-riot training exercises.

Notable nonsporting events
Stadium
Joker Xue – Skyscraper World Tour – 28 July 2018

Arena
Joker Xue – I Think I've Seen You Somewhere Tour – 29 April 2017
Jessie J – The R.O.S.E Tour – 12 September 2018

References

External links

Photos of stadium construction in early 2010

Football venues in China
Sports venues in Shenzhen
2011 Summer Universiade
Sports venues completed in 2011